The 1903 Washington Senators won 43 games, lost 94, and finished in eighth place in the American League. They were managed by Tom Loftus and played home games at the American League Park I.

Washington had finished in sixth place in each of the previous two seasons (the first two seasons of the American League's existence). However, they fell to eighth and last in 1903. Their only star player, Big Ed Delahanty, got drunk and fell off a bridge into Niagara Falls midway through the season.

The Senators' pitching had always been bad, and indeed, they would allow the most runs in the AL, but without Delahanty the offense sputtered to a halt. Their collective batting average was .231, bad even for the dead-ball era, and no one drove in more than 49 runs.

Regular season

Season standings

Record vs. opponents

Notable transactions 
 June 13, 1903: The Senators traded Ducky Holmes to the Chicago White Stockings for a player to be named later. The White Stockings completed the deal by sending Davey Dunkle to the Senators on July 20.

Roster

Player stats

Batting

Starters by position 
Note: Pos = Position; G = Games played; AB = At bats; H = Hits; Avg. = Batting average; HR = Home runs; RBI = Runs batted in

Other batters 
Note: G = Games played; AB = At bats; H = Hits; Avg. = Batting average; HR = Home runs; RBI = Runs batted in

Pitching

Starting pitchers 
Note: G = Games pitched; IP = Innings pitched; W = Wins; L = Losses; ERA = Earned run average; SO = Strikeouts

Other pitchers 
Note: G = Games pitched; IP = Innings pitched; W = Wins; L = Losses; ERA = Earned run average; SO = Strikeouts

Awards and honors

League top five finishers 
Al Orth
 AL leader in earned runs allowed (135)
 #2 in AL in losses (22)
 #2 in AL in hits allowed (326)

Casey Patten
 AL leader in home runs allowed (11)
 #2 in AL in losses (22)
 #3 in AL in earned runs allowed (120)
 #4 in AL in hits allowed (313)
 #4 in AL in walks allowed (80)

Notes

References 
1903 Washington Senators at Baseball-Reference
1903 Washington Senators team page at www.baseball-almanac.com

Minnesota Twins seasons
Washington Senators season
Washington